Paranormal Lockdown is a paranormal reality television series that was executively produced by Nick Groff, formerly of Ghost Adventures. The series follows Nick Groff and fellow paranormal researcher Katrina Weidman (formerly of Paranormal State) as they confine themselves for 72 straight hours in what they claim to be some of the most haunted locations.

The first season aired on Destination America from March 4, 2016 to April 8, 2016. The second season aired from December 16, 2016 to March 3, 2017 on TLC. On November 20, 2018, it was announced that season three would premiere on December 4, 2018, returning to Destination America. On February 14, 2019, Groff announced via a video Instagram post that Paranormal Lockdown would not be returning.

Premise
The series features Nick Groff, a paranormal investigator who is "on a mission to discover something new in the paranormal field", and paranormal researcher Katrina Weidman who both spend 72 hours together in reportedly haunted places. Groff and Weidman believe that "the longer they stay, the more the spirits will communicate with them and the more information they can gather about the unknown". The opening introduction for the show is:

Reception
Investigator Ben Radford states that the claims of living 72 hours in a haunted house as some sort of a challenge is "absurd." People all over the world claim to live in haunted locations, apparently longer than 72 hours. Before you can claim you are living in a haunted house, "ghosts must be proven to exist", a claim that the paranormal community has yet to prove. There are many methodological problems with their investigative techniques, according to Radford. "They fail to properly investigate and verify their assumptions at virtually every step, making leaps of logic and guessing far beyond the evidence". Lockdowns like what you see on this reality show are using ineffective techniques with equipment not meant to be used for this purpose, to look for something that has not been proven to exist or even defined. "A stakeout (such as these) is essentially a scientific experiment without the science". Completely lacking in controls. "Groff and Weidman... are walking around a house with a camera crew, literally and figuratively in the dark. The only things they're testing are their video editors' endurance and the patience of their viewers. These 'reality' television shows are entertainment, not investigation."

Cast and crew

Guest investigators
 Amy Bruni – paranormal investigator, formerly of Ghost Hunters (Episode 1.1: "Trans-Allegheny Lunatic Asylum")
 Adam Berry – paranormal investigator, formerly of Ghost Hunters and Ghost Hunters Academy (Episode 1.1: "Trans-Allegheny Lunatic Asylum")
 Grant Wilson – paranormal investigator, formerly of Ghost Hunters (Episode 1.8: "Randolph County Infirmary")
 John Zaffis – paranormal researcher and demonologist, of Haunted Collector (Halloween Special: "The Black Monk House")
 John E.L. Tenney – paranormal investigator, formerly of Ghost Stalkers (Episode 1.3: "Franklin Castle")
 Aaron Sagers – paranormal researcher (Special: "Evidence Revealed")  
 Michelle Belanger – occult expert (Episode 2.1: "Monroe House")
 Ben Hansen – former FBI forensic agent and paranormal investigator of Fact or Faked: Paranormal Files (Episode 2.5: "Waverly Hills Sanatorium")
 Steve Huff – paranormal engineer and inventor of the "Wonder Box Portal" (Episode 2.6: "Bellaire House")
 George Brown – paranormal engineer and inventor of the "Geo Box" (Episode 2.6: "Bellaire House")
 Johnny Houser – paranormal investigator (lives next door to Iowa's Villisca Murder House) (Episode 2.9: "Malvern Manor")
 Bloody Mary – voodoo priestess in New Orleans (Episode 2.10: "Rampart Street Murder House")
 Greg Newkirk and Dana Matthews Newkirk – paranormal researchers and haunted object collectors (Episode 2.11: "Scutt Mansion")
 Ryan Dunn – paranormal investigator of the Savannah Ghost Research Society (Episode 2.12: "Old Chatham County Jail")
 Daniel Klaes – paranormal investigator, owner of the Hinsdale House (Episode 1.4: "Hinsdale House Unlocked", Episode 2.6 "Statler City Hotel")
 Lee Kirkland – paranormal investigator from Kentucky (Episode 3.6 "Jim Beam Distillery")
 Elizabeth Saint – paranormal investigator and electrical engineer (Episode 3.8 "Beattie Mansion")

Series overview

Specials

Episodes

Season 1 (2016)

Season 2 (2016–17)

Season 3 (2018–19)

International broadcasters

References

External links

2010s American documentary television series
2016 American television series debuts
Paranormal reality television series
English-language television shows
Destination America original programming
TLC (TV network) original programming